Pagan Fury is a Swedish folk metal music group. The group released their first music single Until the Day We Die  in 2018. Pagan Fury participated in Melodifestivalen 2019 with the song "Stormbringer" and they placed seventh in the semifinal.

Discography

References

Swedish folk metal musical groups
Melodifestivalen contestants of 2019